Einsatzgruppe Egypt was an SS unit led by SS-Obersturmbannführer Walther Rauff, which was formed in occupied Greece during World War II. Einsatzgruppen ("deployment groups") were paramilitary death squads that operated within German occupied territories.

Despite the word "Palestine" never being mentioned in the archival documents, the researchers state that the unit's objective was to go there in order to enact systematic mass murder of Jews. Given its small staff of only 24 men, Mallmann and Cüppers theorize the unit would have needed help from local residents and from the Afrika Korps to complete their assignment. On 20 July 1942 Rauff was sent to Tobruk to report to Rommel, Commander of the Afrika Korps. But since Rommel was 500 km away at the First Battle of El Alamein, it is unlikely that the two were able to meet.

According to historian Haim Saadon, Director of the Center of Research on North African Jewry in World War II, Rauff's documents show that his foremost concern was assisting the Wehrmacht, rather than extermination of Jews, and his plan for this was to place the Jews in forced labour camps. In relative terms, the North African Jews escaped the Final Solution.

The plans for Einsatzgruppe Egypt were set aside after the Allied victory at the Second Battle of El Alamein.

See also
200 days of dread

References

Bibliography

Further reading

External links
 Afrika Korps War Crimes - The "War Without Hate" Myth, by Mark Felton

Nazi SS
Einsatzgruppen